Davey Miller (May 4, 1893 – November 1, 1959) was an Old-time Country musician and singer who was active from the 1920's to the 1950's.

Miller, born in Lawrence County, Ohio,  worked on a farm during his youth.  In 1917, when World War I broke out, he joined the army. Soon thereafter he developed an eye infection and was honorably discharged. After discharge he was denied a pension. At some point he had learned guitar and so began a career as an itinerant musician on the medicine show and vaudeville circuit. He married in 1919 and moved to Huntington, West Virginia. Later, after moving, Miller teamed up with banjo player Cecil "Cob" Adkins. They became performers on radio station WSAZ from 1927 to 1933. Miller was often billed as "Davey Miller, The Blind Soldier".

Miller recorded two sides in 1924 and nine more 1927 for Gennett Records. In 1928, he recorded two ballads for Paramount Records under the name of Owen Mills on which he was backed by Frank Welling on steel guitar and David McGee on guitar and harmonica. Welling and McGee also produced and played on a number of country singles for various artists while under contract for Paramount. Although the Great Depression ended most recordings of rural musicians and drove out of business many record labels, including Paramount, Miller would travel to New York City in 1931 for another session for the small Romeo Records. This resulted in another single; a solo guitar instrumental called "Jailhouse Rag".

Typical of the day, Miller's material was a mixture of sentimental ballads and ragtime-influenced guitar solos. He sang in a strong  tenor influenced by that of Vernon Dalhart and unlike the more overtly rural styles of most other country artists of the era suggesting he may have had some vocal training at some point.

Even though Miller was a member of the West Virginia Mockingbirds, he ceased to release any more recordings after 1931 and the band broke up when World War II began. Thereafter he would continue to tour locally and perform on the radio well into the 1950's.  He  shared the stage with many skilled modern performers like Patsy Cline, Hawkshaw Hawkins and T. Texas Tyler; by that time his style was an anachronistic throwback to an earlier era. He died in 1959. Miller was notable for the length of his career, which lasted from the vaudeville age into the modern era without changing his sound, which was already somewhat old-fashioned when he first entered the studio.

References
 "Country Music Records A Discography"; 1921–1942, Tony Russell, Oxford University Press, 2004
 "Paramount Old Time Recordings", liner notes by Pat Harrison, JSP, 2006
 "Old Time Mountain Guitar", liner noted by Robert Fleder, County, 1998

1893 births
1959 deaths
Country musicians from Ohio
American country singer-songwriters
20th-century American singers
Singer-songwriters from Ohio